Gondwanasuchus is an extinct genus of baurusuchid mesoeucrocodylian from the Late Cretaceous Adamantina Formation of Brazil. The type species is Gondwanasuchus scabrosus.

References

Late Cretaceous crocodylomorphs of South America
Cretaceous Brazil
Fossils of Brazil
Adamantina Formation
Fossil taxa described in 2013
Prehistoric pseudosuchian genera